John Burns (born 4 December 1977 in Dublin) is an Irish former professional footballer who played as a midfielder in the Football League for Nottingham Forest, Bristol City, Carlisle United and Burton Albion. Burns later played non-league football for Hucknall Town, Ilkeston Town before ending his career with Hinckley United.

Club career

Burns started his career at Belvedere before joining Forest as a sixteen-year-old in 1994. Touted as "The next Roy Keane", he stayed with Forest for the next four years, making his debut on 4 September 1999 in a league match against Walsall. Despite this, Burns was not able to hold down a regular first team place and made just four appearances for the club.

Following his spell at Forest, John was transferred to Bristol City in November 1999 as part of the deal that saw Jim Brennan move in the opposite direction, with a valuation in the transfer reported as approximately 100k. Burns saw little playing time at City, making just eleven league appearances and spending six months on loan at Shelbourne in Ireland. In November 2001 Burns agreed to terminate his contract with Bristol City, having not featured in the league since the end of the 1999–2000 season.

After leaving Bristol, John signed for Carlisle United on 9 August 2002 on a monthlong contract. Despite making five appearances including four starts, his contract was not extended and Burns was released.

John then moved to Burton Albion, making his debut against Farnborough Town on 30 October 2002.

International career

Whilst at Nottingham Forest, Burns was called up to the Republic of Ireland under-21 national football team, having previously represented his country at Under-16, Under-17 and Under-20 level.

Burns was voted U 18 FAI Young Player Of The Year in 1996. Burns was also voted Young Player Of The Year for Nottingham Forest in the same year.

Honours
Republic of Ireland
FIFA World Youth Championship Third Place: 1997

Post-Football Activity

After leaving Football John formed a band called The Establishment, enlisting the help of the PFA who agreed to fund the production of the band's first EP in June 2008 as part of its programme to help former players start new careers.
The Band is managed by former footballer Dion Dublin.

References

1977 births
Living people
Association football midfielders
Shelbourne F.C. players
League of Ireland players
Nottingham Forest F.C. players
Bristol City F.C. players
Carlisle United F.C. players
Burton Albion F.C. players
English Football League players
Republic of Ireland association footballers
Republic of Ireland expatriate association footballers
Republic of Ireland youth international footballers
Expatriate footballers in England
Irish expatriate sportspeople in England
Hucknall Town F.C. players
Ilkeston Town F.C. (1945) players
Association footballers from Dublin (city)
Belvedere F.C. players
Republic of Ireland under-21 international footballers